The 2009 Baden Open was a professional tennis tournament played on outdoor red clay courts. It was part of the 2009 ATP Challenger Tour. It took place in Karlsruhe, Germany between May 25–31, 2009.

Singles entrants

Seeds

Rankings are as of May 18, 2009.

Other entrants
The following players received wildcards into the singles main draw:
  Ričardas Berankis
  Nicolas Reissig
  Dominik Schulz

The following players received entry from the qualifying draw:
 Dustin Brown
 Adam Chadaj
 Evgeny Donskoy
 Peter Gojowczyk
 Gabriel Moraru (as a Lucky loser)

Champions

Men's singles

 Florian Mayer def.  Dustin Brown, 6–2, 6–4

Men's doubles

 Rameez Junaid /  Philipp Marx def.  Tomasz Bednarek /  Aisam-ul-Haq Qureshi, 7–5, 6–4

References
2009 Draws
Official website
ITF search 

Baden Open
Tennis tournaments in Germany
Sport in Karlsruhe
21st century in Karlsruhe
2000s in Baden-Württemberg